Woronora Cemetery is a closed railway station on the Illawarra railway line in New South Wales, Australia. The station served the Woronora Memorial Park. The station opened in 1900 and closed in 1947.

See also
 Regent Street railway station, a starting point for funeral trains to Woronora.

References

Disused regional railway stations in New South Wales
Railway stations in Australia opened in 1900
Railway stations closed in 1947